Central College Presbyterian Church is a historic Presbyterian church building in Westerville, Ohio.

The Romanesque style building was started in 1870 and was added to the National Register of Historic Places in 1980.

References

Presbyterian churches in Ohio
Churches on the National Register of Historic Places in Ohio
Romanesque Revival church buildings in Ohio
Churches completed in 1870
Westerville, Ohio
Buildings and structures in Franklin County, Ohio
National Register of Historic Places in Franklin County, Ohio